KHYX is a radio station airing a hot adult contemporary format, licensed to Winnemucca, Nevada, broadcasting on 102.7 MHz FM.  The station is owned by Jason and Kelly Crossett, through licensee Nomadic Broadcasting LLC.

References

External links
KHYX's official website

Hot adult contemporary radio stations in the United States
HYX
Radio stations established in 2013
2013 establishments in Nevada